"When Somebody Loves You" is a song written and recorded by American country music artist Alan Jackson.  It was released in March 2001 as the second single and title track from the album of the same name.  It peaked at number 5 on the Hot Country Songs chart.

Critical reception
Deborah Evans Price, of Billboard magazine reviewed the song favorably, saying that Jackson's "warm-throated delivery turns it into a treasure." She goes on to say that there is a "tender, vulnerable quality to his performance, ideally underscored by the mandolin and dobro that enhance the production."

Music video
The music video was directed by chris rogers, and is filmed entirely in black and white, except for one rose, seen at the end of the video. It was one of CMT's Top 20 most-played videos of 2001.

Chart performance
"When Somebody Loves You" debuted at number 42 on the U.S. Billboard Hot Country Singles & Tracks for the week of March 10, 2001.

Year-end charts

References

2000 songs
2001 singles
Alan Jackson songs
Songs written by Alan Jackson
Song recordings produced by Keith Stegall
Arista Nashville singles
Black-and-white music videos